Josef Müller (24 April 1880 – 21 September 1964), also known as Giuseppe Müller, was a Croatian entomologist.

Life 
Josef Müller was born in 1880 in Zadar, at the time part of the Austro-Hungarian Empire. In school, he acquired solid knowledge of the classical languages, as well as of the scientific method.

In 1898, he moved to Graz and studied natural history in the faculty of philosophy, concluding his studies in 1902. His dissertation was about the morphology of land planarians. In 1900, he won the University of Graz's "Unger Prize" for a work on the anatomy of the roots of exotic orchids. At this time he met many Austrian entomologists, such as Ludwig Ganglbauer.

After his doctor examination, Müller moved to Trieste, where he started teaching natural history in Trieste High School and joined the Società Adriaca de Scienze Naturali. Later, he and other entomologists founded an entomology club and developed a comprehensive work program. This led him to study the arthropod fauna found in caves of the Trieste region, especially blind insects. After presenting his results at the International Congress of Zoology in Graz, he became known in larger circles and started many scientific cooperations. One of his most notable works at the time was his monography on blind ground beetles, the "Monographie der blinden Trechen der Ostalpen und Balkanhalbinsel", for which he was awarded the Ganglbauer Prize.

During World War I, his work was interrupted and he was drafted into the military service. There, his entomological knowledge proved to be valuable in the control of diseases transmitted by insects. He spent his first year in an anti-malaria station in Albania and later was invited to the bacteriological laboratory in Vienna. In his study on the body louse, he proved that the bacteria Rickettsia prowazekii, known to cause epidemic typhus, is transmitted by the insect.

In 1921, Müller became the conservator of the Natural History Museum in Trieste, and two years later became the director of the museum and of the botanical gardens. From 1930 to 1940, he traveled several times to North Africa to collect and study beetles of the family Histeridae. He also planned the construction of an aquarium in Trieste, which included many coral fish from Red Sea and that was opened in 1933. He left the museum in 1946 due to his age.

He died in Trieste in 1964, aged 84.

Work 
Most of Müller's work was focused on beetles, especially carabid beetles, and he described 757 new insect taxa, including many new genera. He also studied other animal groups, such as pseudoscorpions, crustaceans, reptiles and birds of prey.

Selected works:

References 

1880 births
1964 deaths
Croatian zoologists
20th-century Italian zoologists
Croatian entomologists
Italian entomologists
Directors of museums in Italy
University of Graz alumni
People from Zadar
20th-century Croatian scientists
Zoologists from the Austro-Hungarian Empire